Roger Brandon Sloan (born May 15, 1987) is a Canadian professional golfer.

Sloan was born in Calgary, Alberta and grew up in Merritt, British Columbia. He played college golf at the University of Texas at El Paso.

After graduating from college with a degree in finance, Sloan turned professional and played on the Canadian Tour, winning once in 2011. He played on the Web.com Tour in 2013 and 2014 and won his first title in July 2014 at the Nova Scotia Open. He finished 24th on the regular-season money list to earn his PGA Tour card for the 2014–15 season.

Sloan recorded his best finish on the PGA Tour at the 2021 Wyndham Championship. He lost in a six-man playoff after Kevin Kisner made a birdie putt on the second playoff hole.

Professional wins (2)

Web.com Tour wins (1)

Web.com Tour playoff record (1–0)

Canadian Tour wins (1)

Playoff record
PGA Tour playoff record (0–1)

Results in major championships

CUT = missed the half-way cut

Results in The Players Championship

CUT = missed the halfway cut

See also
2014 Web.com Tour Finals graduates
2018 Web.com Tour Finals graduates

References

External links

Canadian male golfers
UTEP Miners men's golfers
PGA Tour golfers
Korn Ferry Tour graduates
Golfing people from Alberta
Golfing people from British Columbia
Sportspeople from Calgary
1987 births
Living people